Sarah Hamilton was an Irish stage actress and singer of the eighteenth century.

Born into the Lydall acting family of Dublin, she was the sister of Anna Marcella Lydall who gained fame in England following her marriage to Henry Giffard. She herself acted in the Smock Alley Theatre company for a number of years, alongside her husband named Hamilton and was billed as Mrs Hamilton. In 1732 she debuted in London at the Goodman's Fields Theatre run by her brother-in-law Henry Giffard, appearing in The Beaux Stratagem. She generally specialised in comedies, but also played more serious roles in tragedies.

From 1734 she began playing colombine, beginning with John Frederick Lampe's opera Britannia at the King's Theatre in Haymarket. In 1737 she and her husband moved with Giffard to the Lincoln's Inn Fields Theatre, beginning by playing Philidel in a revival of King Arthur. The Licensing Act of 1737 severely damaged the family's career prospects and after a spell at Drury Lane she returned with her husband to the Smock Alley in Dublin. They were later acting in Edinburgh for many years.

She had at least five children who pursued stage careers including James and William Hamilton.

Selected roles
 Cherry in The Beaux Stratagem (1732)
 Sylvia in The Old Bachelor (1732)
 Rose in The Recruiting Officer (1732)
 Zaida in Scanderbeg (1733)
 Amanthe in The Parricide (1736)
 Dulcissa in The Independent Patriot (1737)
 Eliza in The Plain Dealer (1738)
 Philoten in Marina (1738)

References

Bibliography
 Highfill, Philip H, Burnim, Kalman A. & Langhans, Edward A. A Biographical Dictionary of Actors, Actresses, Musicians, Dancers, Managers, and Other Stage Personnel in London, 1660–1800: Garrick to Gyngell. SIU Press, 1978.

18th-century Irish people
Irish stage actresses
British stage actresses
18th-century Irish actresses
18th-century British actresses
Irish emigrants to Great Britain